Paul Haghedooren (11 October 1959 – 9 November 1997) was a Belgian cyclist. He rode in five editions of the Tour de France and two editions of the Vuelta a España.

Career achievements

Major results

1979
 3rd Circuit de Wallonie
1980
 1st Circuit de Wallonie
 3rd Ronde van Vlaanderen Beloften
1981
 3rd Overall Giro della Valle d'Aosta
 6th Ronde van Vlaanderen Beloften
1982
 2nd GP de Fourmies
 2nd Overall Deutschland Tour
 3rd La Flèche Wallonne
 10th Giro dell'Emilia
1983
 2nd Tour du Hainaut Occidentale
 6th Tour of Flanders
 7th Overall Paris–Nice
1984
 3rd De Brabantse Pijl
 8th Kampioenschap van Vlaanderen
 9th Overall Ronde van Nederland
 10th Kuurne–Brussels–Kuurne
1985
 1st  National Road Race Championships
 1st Grand Prix Cerami
 2nd Le Samyn
 3rd Grand Prix d'Ouverture La Marseillaise
 4th GP Eddy Merckx
 7th Dwars door België
 9th De Brabantse Pijl
 9th Kuurne–Brussels–Kuurne
1986
 7th Circuit des Frontières
1987
 1st Grand Prix Raymond Impanis
 2nd Omloop van het Houtland
 2nd Binche–Tournai–Binche
 5th Circuit des Frontières
 7th Grand Prix de Wallonie
 8th Overall Tour of Britain
1st Stage 4
1988
 7th Overall Tour du Limousin
 7th Overall Setmana Catalana de Ciclisme
1989
 3rd Grand Prix de la Libération (TTT)
 4th National Road Race Championships
1990
 5th De Brabantse Pijl
 6th Overall Tour Méditerranéen
 10th Nokere Koerse
1991
 1st Stage 2 Paris–Bourges
 1st Stage 3 Four Days of Dunkirk
1992
 1st Nationale Sluitingprijs
 2nd De Brabantse Pijl
 3rd Binche–Tournai–Binche
1993
 1st Stage 6 Four Days of Dunkirk
 3rd Grand Prix d'Isbergues
 3rd Binche–Tournai–Binche
 3rd La Côte Picarde
 6th Overall Route du Sud
 10th Druivenkoers Overijse
1994
 4th Tour de Vendée
1995
 1st Stage 3 Tour de Namur
1996
 1st Stage 3 Le Triptyque des Monts et Châteaux

References

1959 births
1997 deaths
Belgian male cyclists
Sportspeople from Kortrijk
Cyclists from West Flanders